The French referendum on the Treaty establishing a Constitution for Europe was held on 29 May 2005 to decide whether France should ratify the proposed Constitution of the European Union. The result was a victory for the "No" campaign, with 55% of voters rejecting the treaty on a turnout of 69%.

The question put to voters was:

Approuvez-vous le projet de loi qui autorise la ratification du traité établissant une Constitution pour l'Europe ?
"Do you approve the bill authorising the ratification of the treaty establishing a Constitution for Europe?"

France was the first country to reject the treaty, and the second country to go to the polls in a referendum on ratification, after a Spanish referendum approved the treaty by a wide margin in February 2005. France's rejection of the Constitution left the treaty with an uncertain future, with other EU member states pledging to continue with their own arrangements for ratification.

The result was surprising to political commentators, with those in favour of the "yes" vote having received 71% of mentions on television between 1 January and 31 March.

Campaign

President Jacques Chirac's decision to hold a referendum was thought in some part to have been influenced in part by the surprise announcement that the United Kingdom was to hold a vote of its own, though it was also widely commented that the expected easy victory would also be an expression of confidence in the President. Moreover, it would do much to cement his legacy as a French statesman. It would also have a divisive effect on the opposition Socialist Party. Although the adoption of a Constitution had initially been played down as a 'tidying-up' exercise with no need for a popular vote, as increasing numbers of EU member states announced their intention to hold a referendum, the French government came under increasing pressure to follow suit.

The date was announced on 4 March 2005. Opinion polling had shown the "Yes" and "No" campaigns in the lead at various times, but in the weeks leading up the referendum the "No" campaign consistently held the lead. This led many, even some on the "Yes" side, to predict openly that France would reject the Constitution.

Socialist Party vote on stance
On 1 December 2004, the opposition Socialist Party held a vote among its members to determine the stance it would take. The issue of the Constitution had caused considerable divisions within the party, with many members—although broadly in favour of European integration—opposing the Constitution for reasons including a perceived lack of democratic accountability, and the threat they considered it posed to the European social model. The "Yes" side was led by party leader François Hollande while the "No" side was led by deputy leader Laurent Fabius. A former prime minister of France (1984–1986), Laurent Fabius traditionally on the center right of the Socialist Party opted for the No to the Constitution, switching to the left of the party. For many commentators, this paradoxical move was a gamble to get the upper hand within the party before the next presidential elections, in case of success of the No vote.

Within the Socialist Party, out of 127,027 members eligible to vote, 59% voted "Yes", with a turnout of 79%. Out of 102 Socialist Party regional federations, 26 voted "No".

Amendment to the French Constitution
The Constitutional Council of France ruled that the European Constitution could not legally coexist with the current Constitution of France. For that reason, a vote was taken to amend the Constitution of France to make the two documents compatible.

This amendment passed in an extraordinary joint session of deputies and senators at the Palace of Versailles on 28 February 2005, with 730 votes in favour and 66 votes against, with 96 abstentions. Both the ruling party and the Socialists supported the constitutional amendment. Communist Party members were the only ones to vote against it.

Opinion polls and course of the campaign 

Initial opinion polls showed a clear majority in favour of the Constitution, but public opposition grew over time. By May, the "Yes" campaign's lead was smaller than the opinion pollsters' margin of error.

The three major political forces in France (UMP, PS and UDF) supported the proposed Constitution, as did president Chirac. Supporters of the Constitution from the left sought to emphasise that the treaty incorporates a Charter of Fundamental Rights and thus helped to secure the future of the European social model. Somewhat surprisingly considering his usual political orientation, Jacques Chirac defended it as a possible barrier against neoliberal economic policies.

Objections to the Constitution in France can be broadly divided into two camps. On the left, many expressed the view that the Constitution would enforce a neoliberal economic model. Among those were some members of the Socialist Party who dissented from the party's stance as decided by its internal referendum, some members of the Green Party (though the party's official policy was also to support ratification), the Communist Party and the Citizen and Republican Movement - a small party allied to the Socialist Party. The Radical Party of the Left, another ally of the Socialist Party, was divided on the question: its main representatives were for the Constitution, while Christiane Taubira, who was candidate for the PRG in 2002, was against it.

Other parties of the hard left, such as the Trotskyist Revolutionary Communist League and Workers' Struggle, as well as associations like ATTAC and trade unions such as the CGT or SUD opposed ratification. These critics sought to link the Constitution to the proposed directive on services in the internal market, which is widely opposed in France.

There were also prominent opponents of the Constitution from the right, notably Nicolas Dupont-Aignan (a Gaullist) and Philippe de Villiers (of the Movement for France), and from the extreme right, Jean-Marie Le Pen of the National Front, who opposed the Constitution on the grounds that France should not be part of any institution whose decisions can take precedence over what is decided in France at a national level. Another factor in the defeat of the Constitution may have been the linking of the Constitution in the minds of voters with the possibility of the accession of Turkey to the European Union, with which most of the French population disagrees. The British UK Independence Party MEP Nigel Farage used funds from the EU Information Budget to send literature to French households opposing the Constitution.

Results

By département

Consequences

The possible consequences of a "No" vote were highly debated in France before the referendum. Proponents of the Constitution, including Jacques Chirac, claimed that France's standing in Europe had been considerably weakened.

Pro-EU campaigners for a "No" vote (as opposed to those opposing the EU altogether) argue that the Constitution will be renegotiated. "No" vote campaigners, particularly the prominent socialist Laurent Fabius, have labelled this option Plan B. Campaigners for a "Yes" vote have stated that there would be no such Plan B and that the 'European project' could be brought to a standstill for at least ten years.

Practically the perspective of a renegotiation quickly appeared illusory after the result of the referendum. First, the challenge of a renegotiation was made all the greater by the diversity of reasons for the rejection of the treaty.
 
Prime Minister Jean-Pierre Raffarin was quickly replaced by Dominique de Villepin. UMP leader Nicolas Sarkozy returned to cabinet as Minister of the Interior.

Although this rejection and the similar vote in the Dutch referendum seriously damaged the Constitution, subsequent EU Presidency holders vowed to keep it going.

Sarkozy was elected President of the French Republic in May 2007. Amongst his pledges was a re-negotiation and ratification of a mini-treaty without a referendum. Eventually, the new version of the text, the Lisbon Treaty, was voted by the Parliament.

On the internal political scene, the success of the referendum did not have the expected effect on the political landscape. Begrudged by the members of the Socialist Party for his divisive role, Laurent Fabius lost the race to the presidential primaries for the 2007 elections, finishing third (18.66%) behind Segolene Royal (60.65%) and Dominique Strauss-Kahn (20.83%). The proponents of the Yes eventually got the upper hand in the party, and the lasting division of the far left prevented the apparition of a strong opposition force on left of the Socialist Party by the proponents of the No. On the right of the political spectrum, the far right did not benefit from the success of the No and suffered, for the first time in 15 years a strong decline in the 2007 elections.

See also
Polish plumber

References

External links
Monitoring report evaluating the fairness of the referendum campaign
Official results from the Ministry of the Interior
Proclamation des résultats du référendum du 29 mai 2005  by the Constitutional Council
Results by département from Le Monde
:fr:Résultats du référendum français du 29 mai 2005 sur la Constitution européenne: detailed results by département on one page (French Wikipedia)
 Mobilization : French books sold; web frequenting (fr); appeals to court (fr)

European Constitution Referendum
European Constitution Referendum
European Constitution referendum
Referendum on the European Constitution
Referendum on the European Constitution, French
Euroscepticism in France
2005 in international relations
2005 in the European Union
European Constitution Referendum
France and the European Union